Aleksandr Aleksandrovich Chernikov (born 13 December 1970) is a former Russian football player.

Club career
He played for the main squads of FC Lokomotiv Moscow and FC Spartak Moscow in the USSR Federation Cup.

References

1970 births
Living people
Soviet footballers
FC FShM Torpedo Moscow players
FC Lokomotiv Moscow players
FC Spartak Moscow players
FC Asmaral Moscow players
Russian footballers
Russian Premier League players
FC Torpedo Miass players
Association football forwards
FC Neftekhimik Nizhnekamsk players